Edith Mabel Gabriel (1882-1972) was a British sculptor.

Biography
Gabriel was born in England at Richmond and studied at the Heatherley School of Fine Art in London and then in Paris. Her sculptures were classical in style and she regularly exhibited in Paris from 1925 onwards, often at the Salon des Artistes Francais. Her sculpture Mother and Child featured in the 1939 volume Modern British Sculpture published by the Royal Society of British Sculptors. Gabriel eventually became a fellow of the Society. As well as in Paris, she exhibited at the Royal Academy, the Royal Scottish Academy, the Royal Glasgow Institute of the Fine Arts and at the Walker Art Gallery in Liverpool. Gabriel died in London, where she had rented a studio in Hampstead since 1915.

References

1882 births
1972 deaths
20th-century British sculptors
20th-century English women artists
Alumni of the Heatherley School of Fine Art
English women sculptors
Modern sculptors
People from Richmond, London
Sculptors from London